Marco Paulo Rebelo Lopes (born 6 June 1976), known as Marco Paulo, is an Angolan retired footballer who played as a forward.

Club career
Marco Paulo was born in Luanda. He made his senior debut with F.C. Alverca in the Segunda Liga as they acted as S.L. Benfica's farm team, and subsequently moved to the lower leagues where he represented three clubs, helping G.D. Estoril Praia return to the second tier at the end of the 2002–03 season with a career-best 16 goals in 35 games.

Marco Paulo then moved abroad, where he would appear for Stade Lavallois (France, Ligue 2) and Ionikos FC (Super League Greece). He had his only top-flight experience with the latter, playing less than one third of the matches and with his side finishing in last position; he retired from football in June 2007, aged 31.

International career
Marco Paulo opted to represent Angola internationally, going on to win five caps. Four of those came during the 2006 FIFA World Cup qualification campaign, against Algeria, Gabon and Zimbabwe (twice), scoring against the second nation in a 2–2 away draw.

References

External links

1976 births
Living people
Angolan people of Portuguese descent
Footballers from Luanda
Portuguese footballers
Angolan footballers
Association football forwards
Liga Portugal 2 players
Segunda Divisão players
F.C. Alverca players
S.C. Dragões Sandinenses players
A.D. Ovarense players
G.D. Estoril Praia players
Ligue 2 players
Stade Lavallois players
Super League Greece players
Ionikos F.C. players
Portugal under-21 international footballers
Angola international footballers
Portuguese expatriate footballers
Angolan expatriate footballers
Expatriate footballers in France
Expatriate footballers in Greece
Portuguese expatriate sportspeople in France
Portuguese expatriate sportspeople in Greece
Angolan expatriate sportspeople in France
Angolan expatriate sportspeople in Greece